Jack Benjamin Olson (August 29, 1920 – July 3, 2003) was an American businessman, diplomat, politician, and Republican from the U.S. state of Wisconsin.

Early life 
Olson was born in Kilbourn (now Wisconsin Dells) in Columbia County, Wisconsin on August 29, 1920, to Jane Zimmerman Olson and Grover Olson. He graduated from Wisconsin Dells High School and attended Western Michigan University. Olson married Eleanor Lang of Kalamazoo, Michigan on March 7, 1942; he graduated from Western Michigan University the same year with a Bachelor of Science degree. Olson enlisted in the U.S. Navy after graduating and became a PT boat commander, serving in the North Atlantic during World War II. Upon returning home, Olson owned and operated Dells Boat Tours and Amphibious Duck rides, serving as president of his family's boat company. He was active in the tourism industry, promoting Wisconsin Dells as a resort town. He was a president of the Wisconsin Vacationland Council.

Political career 
Olson was a Wisconsin delegate to the 1960, 1964, and 1968 National Republican Conventions, and served as state chairman for the presidential campaign of Richard Nixon. During this time he was also the director of the economic development project for the University of Hawaii. Olson served as the 35th and 37th Lieutenant Governor of Wisconsin, from 1963 to 1965 and from 1967 to 1971. He was the director and official representative on the first Trade Mission to Europe and Vice Chairman of Wisconsin's Outdoor Resources Action Program 200 program.

Olson ran unsuccessfully as the Republican nominee for governor of Wisconsin in 1970. Nixon appointed him to the Air Quality Advisory Board; Gerald Ford later appointed him United States Ambassador to the Bahamas (1976–1977) and to the Citizens' Committee on Environmental Quality and the Committee for Economic Co-operation and Development.

Olson won Western Michigan University's Distinguished Alumni Award in 1966.

He died at age 82 on July 3, 2003, at his home in Wisconsin Dells following a long illness.

References

External links
 
Milwaukee Journal Sentinel obituary

1920 births
2003 deaths
People from Wisconsin Dells, Wisconsin
Lieutenant Governors of Wisconsin
Ambassadors of the United States to the Bahamas
Western Michigan University alumni
Businesspeople from Wisconsin
Wisconsin Republicans
Military personnel from Wisconsin
United States Navy personnel of World War II
20th-century American politicians
20th-century American businesspeople